Chaozhou Nanchun High School (Chinese: 潮州市南春中学) is a high school in Chaozhou, Guangdong Province, People's Republic of China. The school was founded in 1976, and currently has more than 2000 students, 208 full-time teachers, nine graduate students, and 138 senior teachers. The campus covers an area of 17,000 square meters.

History
Chaozhou Nanchun High School was founded in August 1976 with its first classes in March 1977, led by its first president Zhuang Jianguo.

In September 1980, the school was integrated into Chaozhou and became an official high school. After the Cultural Revolution, Deng Xiaoping resumed college entrance examinations in 1977. The school's graduates were able to participate in college entrance examinations for the first time in July 1982. In August 1984, the school leadership underwent changes when Li Xuefu was appointed principal and Chen Fangqing became secretary of the party branch.

In 2000, Chaozhou Nanchun High School was listed as one of the 'top ten schools' in Chaozhou and submitted for consideration as a first-tier school. In 2005, the institution was promoted to the status of a first-tier school in Guangdong Province and immediately launched its official website. In 2006, Chaozhou Nanchun High School closed its middle school, to focus its entire educational program on high school level students.

Present
Chaozhou Nanchun High School occupies an area of over 20,000 square meters. The construction area covers approximately 18,000 square meters. The school currently schedules 56 classes, employing 208 full-time teachers, nine graduate students, and 138 senior teachers, offering a curriculum in 13 different subjects: Politics, Chinese, Mathematics, English, Physics, Chemistry, History, Geography, Biology, Sports, Music, Art and Computer Studies. Teachers teach in three languages:  Mandarin, Teochew, and English with each class lasting 45 minutes.

The school's campus has a rich and diverse culture. Numerous activities are organized each year, including an arts and sports festival, as well as cultural performances, choral competitions, and games. Chaozhou Nanchun High School has an active Past Students Association.

References

Links
Chaozhou Nanchun High School Website

Chaozhou
Educational institutions established in 1976
High schools in Guangdong
1976 establishments in China